The 2019 Women's Six Nations Championship was the 18th series of the Women's Six Nations Championship, an annual women's rugby union competition between six European rugby union national teams. Matches were held in February and March 2019, on the same weekends as the men's tournament, if not always the same day.

Table

Fixtures

Week 1

Week 2

Week 3

Week 4

Week 5

References

External links
The official Six Nations Site

Women
2019
2019 rugby union tournaments for national teams
2018–19 in Irish rugby union
2018–19 in English rugby union
2018–19 in Welsh rugby union
2018–19 in Scottish rugby union
2018–19 in French rugby union
2018–19 in Italian rugby union
Six
rugby union
rugby union
rugby union
rugby union
rugby union
rugby union
Six Nations Championship (women)
Six Nations Championship (women)
Six Nations Championship (women)
Six Nations Championship (women)